The War Manpower Commission was a World War II agency of the United States Government charged with planning to balance the labor needs of agriculture, industry and the armed forces.

History 
The Commission was created by President Franklin D. Roosevelt in Executive Order 9139 of April 18, 1942. Its chairman was Paul V. McNutt, head of the Federal Security Agency. In this Executive Order, the War Manpower Commission was headed by the Federal Security Administrator as Chairman, and consisted of representatives from the Department of War, the Department of the Navy, the Department of Agriculture, the Department of Labor, the War Production Board, the Labor Production Division of the War Production Board, the Selective Service System, and the United States Civil Service Commission to ensure effective mobilization of manpower in the post-war era.

Executive Order 9279, dated December 5, 1942, transferred the Selective Service System to the War Manpower Commission. However, a year later it was made a separate agency directly responsible to the President.

McNutt appointed all men to his labor advisory committee, despite the pleas of Women's Bureau director, Mary Anderson, to have women represented. Instead, he created a Women's Advisory Committee appointing thirteen prominent women professionals, business executives, journalists, educators and organizational presidents. However, he did not provide a budget and its members were not paid.

Gallery

References

External links
National Archives: Records of the War Manpower Commission
National Defense University, McNair Paper Number 50, Chapter 10, August 1996, Balancing Military and Civilian Needs
1945 U.S. Government Manual: Directory of Emergency War Agencies

Government agencies established in 1942
Conscription in the United States
Defunct agencies of the United States government
Agencies of the United States government during World War II
1942 establishments in the United States